"Più che puoi" ("As Much As You Can") is a duet by Italian singer Eros Ramazzotti and American singer-actress Cher, released on July 3, 2001 by BMG International. It was also the third single from Ramazzotti's eighth studio album, Stilelibero.

Song information
In the song Cher and Ramazzotti sang both in Italian and English.

A video was released in 2001, featuring Eros Ramazzotti barefoot and playing his guitar in an empty room and Cher singing in a recording studio.

Jose F. Promis, critic, called this duet dramatic.

Charts

Weekly charts

Year-end charts

References

2001 singles
Male–female vocal duets
Cher songs
Eros Ramazzotti songs
Pop ballads
Songs written by Eros Ramazzotti
Songs written by Cher
2001 songs
Articles containing video clips
2000s ballads